The following is a list of herbaria in Turkey. Herbaria are established within faculties and institutes of credible universities. Those created in departments that are concerned with natural sciences such as botany, ecology, biogeography and climatology are mostly used to do research on the genetics of the plants, to examine their distribution on specific geographical locations and to protect them for future generations, while those affiliated with more practice-based departments such as pharmacy are used as a resource for drug production techniques.

The first herbarium in Turkey was opened in 1933 within the Faculty of Science at Ankara University. Founded by Kurt Krause and Hikmet Birand, this herbarium is the oldest among its counterparts in the country and has the most number of species within its 200,000-piece collection. Therefore, it is also called Herbarium Turcicum (Turkish Herbarium). The Sugar Institute Herbarium, Atatürk University Faculty of Science Herbarium and Ege University Faculty of Pharmacy Herbarium are closed to visitors and scientific researchers. However, thanks to a specially created website, it is possible to access all the data related to the Ege University Faculty of Pharmacy Herbarium remotely. Altınbaş University Faculty of Pharmacy Herbarium, which opened in 2018, is the first herbarium to be established by a private university. In addition, Anadolu, Ankara, Ege, Marmara, Onsekiz Mart and Siirt universities have two herbaria each, while Hacettepe, Istanbul and Yüzüncü Yıl universities have three herbaria each. As of 2020, there are 55 herbaria in 34 different provinces of Turkey.

Naming and abbreviation 
To create a herbarium, it is necessary to do a serious research, using archiving and preservation techniques. Although herbaria are usually established within universities' science and pharmacy faculties, institutions such as botanical gardens or natural history museums can also create their own collections. However, aside from preserving them for scientific studies and keeping records of them, it is important to share them with the universal scientific community. Therefore, information tags are assigned to recorded plant samples and the abbreviation of the herbarium within which they are stored is also included. The names and abbreviations of official herbaria are recorded in an international data system called Index Herbariorum, which has been in operation since 1935. While assigning international codes, the name of the city where the herbarium is located is taken into consideration, as well as the name of the institution to which it is affiliated. Herbarium abbreviations are always written in capital letters, consist of at least one and at most eight letters, and no period is added.

Thanks to this system, all herbaria that are active in the world only have a descriptive code of their own and the collections they host are transferred to a common information pool. The system, managed by the International Association for Plant Taxonomy between 1952 and 1974, has been operated by the New York Botanical Garden since 1974. As of 2020, approximately 3,100 herbaria from various countries of the world and more than 390 million samples in total were recorded in this system.

List

Notes

Map

References

External links 
 Index Herbariorum - New York Botanical Garden

Turkey-related lists
Biology-related lists
Nature-related lists
Lists of organizations
Turkey
Turkey